Esq or ESQ may refer to:

 Employee screening questionnaire, a psychological test developed by Canadian psychology professor Douglas N. Jackson
 Esquire (abbreviated Esq.), a modern, informal, non-royally awarded title
 Ensoniq ESQ-1, a synthesizer released by Ensoniq in 1985
 Infiniti ESQ, a Chinese-Japanese subcompact SUV